Happy powder is slang that could refer to the following drugs:

 Cocaine
 Morphine
 Heroin
 A fruit-flavoured date rape drug in Hong Kong